Stenosmia is a genus of bees belonging to the family Megachilidae.

Species:

Stenosmia albatera 
Stenosmia aravensis 
Stenosmia denticulata 
Stenosmia flavicornis 
Stenosmia hartliebi 
Stenosmia jordanica 
Stenosmia kotschisa 
Stenosmia minima 
Stenosmia tagmouta 
Stenosmia xinjiangensis

References

Megachilidae